Rudolf Nureyev's production of Sergei Prokofiev's Romeo and Juliet premiered at the London Coliseum on 2 June 1977.

Background and premiere

Rudolf Nureyev had previously danced as the leading role in Kenneth MacMillan's production of the ballet at the Royal Ballet, Covent Garden in 1965. In 1977, Nureyev left the Royal Ballet and created his own production of the ballet for London Festival Ballet to celebrate the Queen's Silver Jubilee. This production premiered at the London Coliseum on 2 June 1977, with the British ballerina Patricia Ruanne as Juliet and Rudolf as Romeo. This production is still in the English National Ballet's repertoire.

This production was later staged for the La Scala Theatre Ballet and the first night took place on 20 December 1980, with Carla Fracci as Juliet and the choreographer as Romeo. This production was filmed in 1983 and broadcast in Italy and Britain, with the participation of Margot Fonteyn as Lady Capulet.

In 1984, this production was introduced to Paris Opera Ballet with Monique Loudières and Patrick Dupond as the leading roles. The production was filmed and released in DVD format in 1995, featuring Loudières as Juliet and Manuel Legris as Romeo.

Original cast
 Patricia Ruanne, Juliet
 Rudolph Nureyev, Romeo
 Nicholas Johnson, Mercutio
 Jonas Kåge, Benvolio
 Frederic Jahn-Werner, Tybalt
 Elisabeth Anderton, Nurse

1980 Milan cast
 Carla Fracci, Juliet
 Rudolph Nureyev, Romeo
 Paolo Podini, Mercutio
 Angelo Moretto, Benvolio
 Tiziano Mietto, Tybalt
 Maddalena Campa, Nurse

1984 Paris cast
 Monique Loudières, Juliet
 Patrick Dupond, Romeo
 Cyril Atanassoff, Tybalt
 Jean-Pierre Franchetti, Mercutio
 Laurent Hilaire, Paris
 Yvette Chauviré, Lady Capulet

1995 Paris (DVD) cast
 Monique Loudières, Juliet
 Manuel Legris, Romeo
 Charles Jude, Tybalt
 Lionel Delanoë, Mercutio
 Wilfried Romoli, Benvolio
 José Martínez, Paris
 Karin Averty, Rosaline
 Clotilde Vayer, Lady Capulet
 Olivier Patey, Lord Capulet
 Annie Carbonnel, Nurse

References

Sources

Childs, Peter. and Storry, Michael. Encyclopedia of Contemporary British Culture. Routledge, 2013.
Snodgrass, Mary Ellen. The Encyclopedia of World Ballet. Rowman & Littlefield, 2015.

Ballets by Sergei Prokofiev
1977 ballet premieres
Ballets based on Romeo and Juliet